= Council of Czech Television =

Council of Czech Television (Czech: Rada České televize) is the body exercising the public's right to control the activities of Czech Television. Its responsibilities are regulated by Act No. 483/1991 Coll. about Czech Television.

== Responsibilities ==
List of resoponsibilities according to Act No. 483/1991 Coll.:

- to appoint and dismiss the general director and, on his proposal, the director of television studios of Czech Television
- approve the budget and the final account of Czech Television and control the implementation of the budget of Czech Television
- to approve the Statute of Czech Television on the proposal of the General Director
- submit the Code of Czech Television to the Chamber of Deputies for approval
- to approve the general director's proposals for the establishment or cancellation of television studios (Section 9, paragraph 8)
- decide on complaints concerning the Director General
- supervise the performance of public service tasks in the field of television broadcasting and the fulfillment of the principles arising from the Czech Television Code
- approve long-term plans for programmatic, technical and economic development
- establish a supervisory committee and determine the salary of the CEO
- submit an annual report on the activities and management of Czech Television to the Chamber of Deputies (which is responsible for its activities)
- The council operates according to its own budget, the costs of the council's activities and the remuneration of its members, as well as the costs of the activities of the Supervisory Commission and the remuneration of its members, are paid from a special expenditure item of the Czech Television budget.

== Composition ==
The council has 18 members, who are elected and dismissed by the Chamber of Deputies (12 Council members) and the Senate (6 Council members), from candidates proposed by legal entities that have been in existence for at least 10 years at the time of the submission of the proposal and that represent cultural, regional, social, trade union, employer, religious, educational, scientific, ecological and national interests. Council members are elected for a term of office of 6 years and are responsible for the performance of their duties to the chamber of Parliament that elected them; they can be re-elected. New members are elected to positions vacated for reasons other than the expiration of the term of office for the remainder of the term of office of the member whose position has become vacant.

== Controversy ==
Current general manager of Czech Television is Jan Souček, who was elected for a six-year term by the Czech Television Council (Czech: Rada České televize). Souček has courted controversy in his tenure given his attack on free media and his attacks on employees of Czech Television. Souček compared himself to Milada Horáková after strong criticism of his managerial skills from Czech Television Council. Souček later commented that it was silly from him. In an interview on 5. 9. 2023‌ Souček, as the incoming director general, stated: "I am constantly asking for money. A press conference of the Ministry of Culture has been announced for Tuesday, where the ministerial commission should reveal how it envisions the reform of financing public service media. According to my information, our call will be heard for the most part." During his tenure, Souček constantly asks for more money from the public fees, however it seems that he is not able to use money economically while blacking out financial documents to hide it from the public.

Souček discussed masturbation as part of his defence given his attack on free media.

In 2025, Jan Souček, the CEO of Czech Television, said that two members of the Czech Television Board, Pavel Matocha and Luboš Xaver Veselý, were allegedly blackmailing him.
